Presidential elections were held in El Salvador on 19 March 1989. The result was a victory for Alfredo Cristiani of the ARENA party, who secured a majority in the first round. The election marked the first time in Salvadoran history that power was transferred from one democratically elected president to another. Voter turnout was 54.7%.

Results

References

1989
1989 in El Salvador
1989 elections in Central America